Borer may refer to:

Insects 
 Stem borer
 Twig borer
 Shoot borer

Moths 
Chilo (moth)
Diatraea grandiosella, southwestern corn borer
Podosesia syringae, ash borer or lilac borer
Melittia cucurbitae, squash vine borer, a pest of cucurbit vines
Ostrinia, pests of maize and other plants

Beetles 
 Cosmopolites sordidus (banana stemborer), a true weevil in genus Cosmopolites
 Ptinidae, a family of beetles, especially:
 Anobium punctatum, common furniture borer
 Woodboring beetles

Devices 
 Cork borer, a tool of the chemistry laboratory
 Raise borer, a mining machine
 Instep borer, an instrument of torture
 Tunnel boring machine
 Reamer, a rotary cutting tool used in metalworking
 Drill

Other 
 Hotheaded Naked Ice Borer, a fictional mammal
 Borer Lake, United States
 בורר ("borer"), Sorting/Purification, one of the activities prohibited in Jewish law on Shabbat

Animal common name disambiguation pages